Batara Kresna Railbus is a railbus service in Central Java, Indonesia that operates between  Station in Surakarta and  Station in Wonogiri Regency. It is operated by PT Kereta Api Indonesia (KAI) and is a cooperation project between the Surakarta city government and KAI, when the city was led by Joko Widodo. The service is the one of a few railbus service in Indonesia besides Lembah Anai railbus in West Sumatra and former Kertalaya railbus in South Sumatra.

The railbus took its name from a character in Mahabharata, Krishna or Kresna who is tasked with saving the world and upholding the truth after the war in Kurukshetra.

History 
Batara Kresna railbus was introduced to the public on 26 July 2011 and inaugurated by Indonesian Minister of Transport Freddy Numberi in Surakarta along with the city's double-decker tourist bus service. The railbus began operation on 5 August 2012, initially with Sukoharjo – Purwosari –  route.

Stations 
Note: Only lists active stations

Gallery

References

External links 
  KAI official website

Transport in Central Java
Passenger rail transport in Indonesia